"Lines on Palms" is a song by Australian singer-songwriter Josh Pyke. It was released in March 2007 as the second single from Pyke's debut studio album, Memories & Dust. The song peaked at number 33, becoming Pyke's highest charting single.

Track listing

Charts

References

2007 songs
2007 singles
Josh Pyke songs